Call of the Valley is a 1967 light-classical album by Hariprasad Chaurasia, Brij Bhushan Kabra, and Shivkumar Sharma. It was recorded for the label EMI.

The instrumental album follows a day in the life of an Indian shepherd from Kashmir. It is one of the most successful Indian albums and one that became popular with an international audience. It was very important in introducing Indian music to Western ears and internationally the best selling Indian music record. George Harrison, David Crosby, Paul McCartney, Bob Dylan and Roger McGuinn are fans of the album.

The atmospheric music is traditional, but the innovative use of guitar and flute make the sound more acceptable for Western audiences. Kabra plays slide guitar, Sharma santoor, Chaurasia bansuri and Tabla was played by Manikrao Popatkar. The artists became well known musicians as a result of this album. Today Call of the Valley is considered a classic and a milestone in world music.

Shivkumar Sharma, the guitarist Brij Bhushan Kabra, and flutist Hariprasad Chaurasia were all aged about 30 when they made Call of the Valley. Conceived as a suite, they used their instruments to tell the story of a day in the life of a shepherd in Kashmir using ragas associated with various times of the day to advance the dramatic narrative. Allmusic advises: "If the newcomer buys only one Indian classical recording, it should be "Call of the Valley"."

The remastered edition on hEMIsphere has three bonus tracks.

It is listed in the book 1001 Albums You Must Hear Before You Die by Robert Dimery and Michael Lydon.

Track listing  

 Ahir Bhairav/Nat Bhairav - 12:35
 Rag Piloo - 07:58
 Bhoop - 06:16
 Rag Des - 06:09
 Rag Pahadi - 06:48
 Ghara-Dadra (Bonus Track 1) - 07:25
 Dhun-Mishra Kirwani (Bonus Track 2) - 12:58
 Bageshwari (Bonus Track 3) - 10:46

References

External links 
 The Dawn of Indian classical music in the West, page 32-33
 Amazon.com Link

1967 albums
EMI Records albums
Hariprasad Chaurasia albums
Brij Bhushan Kabra albums
Shivkumar Sharma albums